Dubovets is a rural locality (a khutor) in Besedinsky Selsoviet Rural Settlement, Kursky District, Kursk Oblast, Russia. Population:

Geography 
The khutor is located 112 km from the Russia–Ukraine border, 27 km south-east of the district center – the town Kursk, 11.5 km from the selsoviet center – Besedino.

 Climate
Dubovets has a warm-summer humid continental climate (Dfb in the Köppen climate classification).

Transport 
Dubovets is located on the federal route  (Kursk – Voronezh –  "Kaspy" Highway; a part of the European route ), 11.5 km from the nearest railway halt Gutorovo (railway line Klyukva — Belgorod).

The rural locality is situated 27 km from Kursk Vostochny Airport, 113 km from Belgorod International Airport and 178 km from Voronezh Peter the Great Airport.

References

Notes

Sources

Rural localities in Kursky District, Kursk Oblast